The 1981 Ottawa Rough Riders finished the season in 2nd place in the East Division with a 5–11 record. They appeared in the Grey Cup game, in what would be their last Grey Cup appearance in franchise history, and the last for any Ottawa-based CFL team for 34 years.

Offseason

CFL Draft

Preseason

Regular season

Standings

Schedule

Postseason

Grey Cup

First Quarter

Ottawa – FG – Gerry Organ 34 yards
Ottawa – FG – Gerry Organ 37 yards
Ottawa – TD – Jim Reid 1-yard run (Gerry Organ convert)

Second Quarter

Ottawa – TD – Sam Platt 14-yard run (Gerry Organ convert) 
Edmonton – Single – Dave Cutler 24 yards missed Field Goal

Third Quarter

Edmonton – TD – Jim Germany 2-yard run (Dave Cutler convert)
Edmonton – TD – Warren Moon 1-yard run (Dave Cutler convert)

Fourth Quarter

Ottawa – FG – Gerry Organ 28 yards
Edmonton – TD – Warren Moon 1-yard run (Marco Cyncar 2 point convert pass from Moon)
Edmonton – FG – Dave Cutler 27 yards

Awards and honours

References

Ottawa Rough Riders seasons
James S. Dixon Trophy championship seasons
1981 Canadian Football League season by team